Crypto: How the Code Rebels Beat the Government Saving Privacy in the Digital Age is a book about cryptography written by Steven Levy, published in 2001. Levy details the emergence of public key cryptography, digital signatures and the struggle between the National Security Agency (NSA) and the "cypherpunks". The book details the creation of Data Encryption Standard (DES), RSA and the Clipper chip.

Summary

See also
 Books on cryptography
 Crypto wars

References

External links
Presentation on Crypto by Levy, January 22, 2001, C-SPAN

2001 non-fiction books
Cryptography books
Computer security books
Books by Steven Levy